Silvius appendiculatus is a species of horse fly in the family Tabanidae.

Distribution
Spain, Algeria, Syria.

References

Tabanidae
Insects described in 1846
Diptera of Europe
Taxa named by Pierre-Justin-Marie Macquart